Blayney was an electoral district of the Legislative Assembly in the Australian state of New South Wales, created in 1904 re-distribution of electorates following the 1903 New South Wales referendum, which required the number of members of the Legislative Assembly to be reduced from 125 to 90. It consisted of parts of Hartley, The Macquarie and the abolished seat of West Macquarie, and named after and including Blayney. It was abolished in 1913 and partly replaced by Lyndhurst.

Members for Blayney

Election results

References

Blayney
Blayney
1904 establishments in Australia
Blayney
1913 disestablishments in Australia